The Rural Municipality of Caledonia No. 99 is a rural municipality (RM) in the Canadian province of Saskatchewan within Census Division No. 2 and  Division No. 2. It is located in the southeast portion of the province.

History 
The RM of Caledonia No. 99 incorporated as a rural municipality on December 13, 1909.

Heritage properties
There is one historical building located within the RM.
Bethesda Lutheran Church - Constructed in 1912, and located within Bethesda. The church operated from 1912 until 1973.

Geography

Communities and localities 
The following urban municipalities are surrounded by the RM.

Towns
 Milestone

The following unincorporated communities are located within the RM.

Organized hamlets
 Parry

Localities
 Dummer

Demographics 

Government 
The RM of Caledonia No. 99 is governed by an elected municipal council and an appointed administrator that meets on the first Tuesday of every month. The reeve of the RM is Mark Beck while its administrator is Stephen Schury. The RM's office is located in Milestone.

References 

C

Division No. 2, Saskatchewan